The 1978 Wyler's Classic was a women's singles tennis tournament played on indoor carpet courts at the Alexander Memorial Coliseum in Atlanta, Georgia in the United States. The event was part of the AAA category of the 1978 Colgate Series. It was the third edition of the tournament and was held from September 25 through October 1, 1978. Second-seeded Chris Evert won the singles title and earned $20,000 first-prize money.

Finals

Singles
 Chris Evert defeated  Martina Navratilova 7–6(7–3), 0–6, 6–3
It was Evert's 4th singles title of the year and the 82nd of her career.

Doubles
 Françoise Dürr /  Virginia Wade defeated  Martina Navratilova /  Anne Smith 4–6, 6–2, 6–4

Prize money

Notes

See also
 Evert–Navratilova rivalry

References

External links
 ITF tournament details
  WTA tournament details

Wyler's Classic
Wyler's Classic
Wyler's Classic
Wyler's Classic
Wyler's Classic